The 1894 Home Nations Championship was the twelfth series of the rugby union Home Nations Championship. Six matches were played between 6 January and 17 March. It was contested by England, Ireland, Scotland and Wales.

Table

Results

Scoring system
The matches for this season were decided on points scored. A try was worth three points, while converting a kicked goal from the try gave an additional two points. A dropped goal and a goal from mark were both worth four points. Penalty goals were worth three points.

The matches

England vs. Wales

England: JF Byrne (Moseley), F Firth (Halifax), Charles Hooper (Middlesex Wands.), S Morfitt (West Hartlepool), R E Lockwood (Heckmondwike) capt., EW Taylor (Rockcliff), Cyril Wells (Harlequins), F Soane (Bath), J Hall (North Durham), J Toothill (Bradford), H Bradshaw (Bramley), T Broadley (Bingley), Harry Speed (Castleford), William Eldon Tucker (Cambridge U.), Alfred Allport (Blackheath)

Wales: Billy Bancroft (Swansea), Norman Biggs (Cardiff), William McCutcheon (Oldham), Arthur Gould (Newport) capt., Conway Rees (Llanelli), Percy Phillips (Newport), Fred Parfitt (Newport), Frank Mills (Swansea), Charles Nicholl (Llanelli), David Daniel (Llanelli), Jim Hannan (Newport), Frank Hill (Cardiff), Arthur Boucher (Newport), Tom Graham (Newport), Wallace Watts (Newport)

England vs. Ireland

England: JF Byrne (Moseley), F Firth (Halifax), Charles Hooper (Middlesex Wands.), S Morfitt (West Hartlepool), R E Lockwood (Heckmondwike) capt., EW Taylor (Rockcliff), R Wood (Liversedge RFC), F Soane (Bath), J Hall (North Durham), J Toothill (Bradford), H Bradshaw (Bramley), T Broadley (Bingley), Harry Speed (Castleford), William Eldon Tucker (Cambridge U.), Alfred Allport (Blackheath)

Ireland: W Sparrow (Dublin U.), HG Wells (Bective Rangers), S Lee (NIFC), W Gardiner (NIFC), Lucius Gwynn (Dublin U.), WS Brown (Dublin U.), Benjamin Tuke (Bective Rangers), JN Lytle (NIFC), EG Forrest (Wanderers) capt., H Lindsay (Dublin U.), Thomas Crean (Wanderers), G Walmsley (Bective Rangers), JH O'Conor (Bective Rangers), CV Rooke (Dublin U.), JH Lytle (NIFC)

Wales vs. Scotland

Wales: Billy Bancroft (Swansea), William Llewellyn Thomas (Newport), Tom Pearson (Oldham), Arthur Gould (Newport) capt., Dai Fitzgerald (Cardiff), Percy Phillips (Newport), Fred Parfitt (Newport), Frank Mills (Swansea), Charles Nicholl (Llanelli), David Daniel (Llanelli), Jim Hannan (Newport), Frank Hill (Cardiff), Harry Day (Newport), Tom Graham (Newport), Wallace Watts (Newport)

Scotland: J Rogerson (Kelvinside Acads.), GT Campbell (London Scottish), Gregor MacGregor  (London Scottish) capt., James Gowans (Cambridge U.), Henry Gedge (London Scottish), JW Simpson (Royal HSFP), William Wotherspoon (West of Scotland), HF Menzies (West of Scotland), JB Wright (Watsonians), WMC McEwan (Edinburgh Acads), A Dalgleish (Gala), WR Gibson (Royal HSFP), WB Cownie (Watsonians), GT Neilson (West of Scotland), Robert MacMillan (London Scottish)

Ireland vs. Scotland

Ireland: PJ Grant (Bective Rangers), HG Wells (Bective Rangers), S Lee (NIFC), W Gardiner (NIFC), Lucius Gwynn (Dublin U.), WS Brown (Dublin U.), Benjamin Tuke (Bective Rangers), JN Lytle (NIFC), EG Forrest (Wanderers) capt., H Lindsay (Dublin U.), Thomas Crean (Wanderers), ATW Bond (Derry), JH O'Conor (Bective Rangers), CV Rooke (Dublin U.), JH Lytle (NIFC)

Scotland: AWC Cameron (Watsonians), GT Campbell (London Scottish), Gregor MacGregor  (London Scottish), William Wotherspoon (West of Scotland), HTS Gedge (London Scottish), JW Simpson (Royal HSFP), WP Donaldson (Oxford U.), HTO Leggatt (Watsonians), JD Boswell (West of Scotland) capt., AH Anderson (Glasgow Acads), A Dagleish (Gala), WR Gibson (Royal HSFP), WB Cownie (Watsonians), GT Nielson (West of Scotland), Robert MacMillan (London Scottish)

Scotland vs. England

Scotland: Gregor MacGregor  (London Scottish), James Gowans (Cambridge U.), Willie Neilson (Cambridge U.), GT Campbell (London Scottish), HTS Gedge (London Scottish), JW Simpson (Royal HSFP), William Wotherspoon (West of Scotland), HTO Leggatt (Watsonians), JD Boswell (West of Scotland) capt., WMC McEwan (Edinburgh Acads), HF Menzies (West of Scotland), WR Gibson (Royal HSFP), WB Cownie (Watsonians), WG Nielson (Merchiston Castle), Robert MacMillan (London Scottish)

England: JF Byrne (Moseley), F Firth (Halifax), Charles Hooper (Middlesex Wands.), S Morfitt (West Hartlepool), Walter Jesse Jackson (Halifax), EW Taylor (Rockcliff) capt., Cyril Wells (Harlequins), F Soane (Bath), J Hall (North Durham), William Walton (Castleford), H Bradshaw (Bramley), T Broadley (Bingley), Harry Speed (Castleford), Albert Elliott (St. Thomas' Hosp.), Alfred Allport (Blackheath)

Ireland vs. Wales

Ireland: PJ Grant (Bective Rangers), R Dunlop (NIFC), S Lee (NIFC), W Gardiner (NIFC), Lucius Gwynn (Dublin U.), WS Brown (Dublin U.), Benjamin Tuke (Bective Rangers), JN Lytle (NIFC), JH Lytle (NIFC), EG Forrest (Wanderers) capt., H Lindsay (Dublin U.), Thomas Crean (Wanderers), ATW Bond (Derry), JH O'Conor (Bective Rangers), CV Rooke (Dublin U.)

Wales: Billy Bancroft (Swansea), Norman Biggs (Cardiff), Tom Pearson (Oldham), Jack Elliott (Cardiff), Dai Fitzgerald (Cardiff), Ralph Sweet-Escott (Cardiff), Fred Parfitt (Newport), Frank Mills (Swansea), Fred Hutchinson (Neath), David Daniel (Llanelli), Jim Hannan (Newport), Frank Hill (Cardiff) capt., Harry Day (Newport), David Nicholl (Llanelli), Wallace Watts (Newport)

External links

1893-94
1893–94 in British rugby union
1893–94 in English rugby union
rugby union
rugby union
Home Nations Championship
Home Nations Championship
Home Nations Championship
1893–94 in Scottish rugby union